Tetrahydrocoptisine (also known as stylopine) is an alkaloid isolated from Corydalis impatiens.

References

5,6,7,8-Tetrahydro-(1,3)dioxolo(4,5-g)isoquinolines